Thomas, Tom or Tommy Knox may refer to:

 Thomas Knox (bishop) (died 1627/28), Scottish prelate
 Thomas Knox (died 1728) (c. 1640–1728), Irish MP for Newtonards and Dungannon
Thomas Knox (footballer) (born 1939), Scottish footballer
 Thomas Knox (1694–1769), Irish MP for Dungannon
 Thomas Francis Knox (1822–1882), Anglo-Irish Roman Catholic priest and author
 Sir Thomas George Knox (1824–1887), Irish soldier and diplomat, consul-general in Siam
Sir Thomas Malcolm Knox (1900–1980), British philosopher and Principal of St Andrews University
 Thomas W. Knox (1835–1896), journalist, author and world traveler
 Thomas Knox, 1st Viscount Northland (1729–1818), Irish politician
 Thomas Knox, 1st Earl of Ranfurly (1754–1840), Irish peer and politician
 Thomas Knox, 2nd Earl of Ranfurly (1786–1858), Anglo-Irish peer and politician
 Thomas Knox, 3rd Earl of Ranfurly (1816–1858), Irish peer and Member of Parliament
 Tom Knox, American businessman and politician
 Tom Knox (author), pseudonym of British writer and journalist Sean Thomas
 Tommy Knox (1905–1954), English football goalkeeper